The 2009 IAAF World Athletics Tour was the fourth and final edition of the annual global circuit of one-day track and field competitions organized by the International Association of Athletics Federations (IAAF). The series featured 25 one-day meetings, consisting of the six meetings of the 2009 IAAF Golden League, five IAAF Super Grand Prix meetings, and fourteen IAAF Grand Prix meetings. In addition, there were 29 Area Permit Meetings that carried point-scoring events. The series culminated in the two-day 2009 IAAF World Athletics Final, held in Thessaloniki, Greece from 12–13 September.

Russian pole vaulter Yelena Isinbayeva scored the most points during the circuit, with a total of 106. Five other athletes achieved a total of 100 points: distance runner Kenenisa Bekele, hurdler Dayron Robles, sprinters Kerron Stewart and Sanya Richards, and high jumper Blanka Vlašić.

Schedule

Points standings
Athletes earned points at meetings during the series. The following athletes were the top performers for their event prior to the World Athletics Final.

References

External links
Official 2009 World Athletics Final website

2009
World Athletics Tour